Witów  is a village in the administrative district of Gmina Sulejów, within Piotrków County, Łódź Voivodeship, in central Poland.

A former of Norbertine monastery is today the towns church dedicated to St. Peter, Margaret and St. Augustine.

References

Villages in Piotrków County